The following is a list of lists of currently active military equipment by country.

Afghanistan 
 List of active aircraft of the Afghan Air Force
 List of military equipment used by Afghan National Army

Albania 
 List of equipment of the Albanian Armed Forces

Algeria 
 List of equipment of the Algerian Land Forces

Angola 
 List of equipment of the Angolan Army
 Active aircraft of the National Air Force of Angola

Argentina 
 Active Argentine Navy ships
 Active Argentina military aircraft
 Equipment of the Argentine Army

Armenia 
 List of equipment of the Armenian Armed Forces

Australia 
 Current Royal Australian Navy ships
 Current Royal Australian Air Force Aircraft
 Equipment of the Australian Army

Austria 
 List of equipment of the Austrian Army
 Active aircraft of the Austrian Air Force

Azerbaijan 
 Modern equipment of the Azerbaijani Land Forces
 Modern equipment of the Azerbaijani Air Force

Bahrain 
 List of equipment of the Royal Bahraini Army
 List of equipment of the Royal Bahrain Naval Force
 List of aircraft of the Royal Bahraini Air Force

Bangladesh 
 Currently active ships of the Bangladesh Navy
 List of ships of the Bangladesh Coast Guard
 Active aircraft of the Bangladesh Air Force
 Active Bangladesh military aircraft
 Equipment of the Bangladesh Army

Belarus 
 List of equipment of the Armed Forces of Belarus
 List of aircraft of the Belarusian Air Force

Belgium 
 List of equipment of the Belgian Land Component
 List of equipment of the Belgian Navy
 List of aircraft of the Belgian Air Componant

Belize 
 List of equipment of the Belize Defence Force

Benin 
 List of equipment of the Benin Armed Forces

Bhutan 
 List of equipment used by the Royal Bhutan Army

Bolivia 
 List of equipment of the Bolivian Armed Forces
 List of aircraft of the Bolivian Air Force

Bosnia and Herzegovina 
 List of equipment of the Armed Forces of Bosnia and Herzegovina
 List of aircraft of the Air Force of Bosnia and Herzegovina

Botswana 
 List of equipment of the Botswana Ground Force
 List of aircraft of the Botswana Defence Force Air Wing

Brazil 
 currently active Brazil military watercraft 
 currently active Brazil military land vehicles 
 Active Brazilian military aircraft
 Modern equipment of the Brazilian Army

Brunei 
 List of equipment of the Royal Brunei Land Forces
 List of aircraft of the Royal Brunei Air Force
 List of Royal Brunei Navy ships

Bulgaria 
 Modern equipment of the Bulgarian land forces
 List of aircraft of the Bulgarian Air Force
 List of equipment of the Bulgarian Navy

Burkina Faso 
 List of equipment of the Burkina Faso Armed Forces
 List of aircraft of the Burkina Faso Air Force

Burundi 
 List of equipment of the Burundi National Defence Force

Cabo Verde, Republic of  
 List of equipment of the Cape Verdean Armed Forces

Cambodia 
 List of equipment of the Royal Cambodian Army

Cameroon 
 List of equipment of the Cameroon Army
 List of aircraft of the Cameroon Air Force
 List of equipment of the Cameroon Navy

Canada 
 Fleet of the Royal Canadian Navy
 List of aircraft of the Royal Canadian Air Force
 List of active Canadian military aircraft
 List of modern Canadian Army equipment

Central African Republic 
 List of equipment of the Central African Army
 List of aircraft of the Central African Republic Air Force

Chad 
 List of equipment of the Chadian Ground Forces
 List of aircraft of the Chadian Air Force

Chile 
 List of current equipment of the Chilean Air Force
 List of current equipment of the Chilean Army
 List of active ships of the Chilean Navy
 List of active Chile military aircraft
 List of current equipment of the Chilean Marine Corps

China 
 Active Chinese Navy ships
 Active Chinese military aircraft
 Aircraft of the People's Liberation Army Air Force
 Equipment of the PLA Ground Force

Côte d'Ivoire 
 List of equipment of the armed forces of the Republic of Ivory Coast

Colombia 
 List of equipment of the National Army of Colombia
 List of aircraft of the Colombian Air Force
 List of active ships of the Colombian Navy

Comoros 
 List of equipment of the Comorian Army

Croatia 
 List of equipment of the Croatian Army

Cuba 
 List of equipment of the Cuban Revolutionary Armed Forces

Cyprus 
 List of military equipment of Cyprus

Czechia 
 Military equipment of the Czech Republic

DR Congo 
 List of equipment of the Democratic Republic of the Congo Army

Denmark 
 List of equipment of the Royal Danish Army

Djibouti 
 List of equipment of the Djiboutian Army

Dominican Republic 
 List of equipment of the Dominican Army

Egypt 
 Equipment of the Egyptian Army

El Salvador 
 List of equipment of the Salvadoran Army

Eritrea 
 List of equipment of the Eritrean Army

Ecuador 
 List of equipment of the Ecuadorian Army

Estonia 
 List of equipment of the Estonian Defence Forces

Ethiopia 

 List of equipment of the Ethiopian Army

Finland 
 List of equipment of the Finnish Army
 List of equipment of the Finnish Navy
 List of active Finnish Navy ships
 List of military aircraft of Finland

France 
 Active French Navy ships
 Modern equipment and uniform of the French Army
 Active French military aircraft

Georgia 
 List of equipment of the Defense Forces of Georgia

Germany 

 List of modern equipment of the German Army
 Active German Navy ships

Greece 
 List of equipment of the Hellenic Army
 List of active Hellenic Navy ships
 List of aircraft of the Hellenic Air Force

Iceland 
 List of aircraft of the Icelandic Coast Guard

India 
 Active Indian Navy ships
 Equipment of the Indian Army
 Active Indian military aircraft
 Indian Coast Guard
 Guided missiles of India
 Weapon systems of the Indian Navy

Indonesia 
 Equipment of the Indonesian Navy
 Equipment of the Indonesian Army
 Equipment of the Indonesian Air Force
 List of active Indonesian Navy ships
 List of aircraft of the Indonesian National Armed Forces

Iran 
 List of active Iranian Navy ships
 List of active Iranian military Aircraft
 Equipment of Iranian army

Israel 

 List of equipment of the Israel Defense Forces
 List of aircraft of the Israeli Air Force
 List of ships of the Israeli Navy

Ireland 
 Modern equipment of the Irish Army
 List of aircraft of the Irish Air Corps

Italy 
 Equipment of the Italian Army
 List of active Italian military aircraft
 List of active Italian Navy ships
 List of aircraft used by Italian Air Force

Japan 
 Active Japan Maritime Self-Defense Force ships
 List of modern equipment of the Japan Ground Self-Defense Force

Latvia 
 Equipment of the Latvian Land Forces

Lithuania 
 List of equipment of the Lithuanian Armed Forces
 Lithuanian Air Force
 Lithuanian Naval Force

Malaysia 
 Equipment of the Malaysian Army
 Equipment of the Royal Malaysian Air Force
 Equipment of the Royal Malaysian Navy
 List of aircraft of the Malaysian Armed Forces

Malta 
 Equipment of the Armed Forces
 Active aircraft of the Air Wing
 Active vessels of the Maritime Squadron

Morocco
List of active Moroccan military aircraft
List of equipment of the Royal Moroccan Army

Myanmar 
 List of equipment of the Myanmar Army
 List of equipment in the Myanmar Navy
  Myanmar Air Force

Netherlands 
 Equipment of the Royal Netherlands Army
 Active Royal Netherlands Navy ships
 Equipment of the Royal Netherlands Air Force

New Zealand 
 List of active New Zealand military aircraft
 List of active Royal New Zealand Navy ships
 List of equipment of the New Zealand Army
 List of individual weapons of the New Zealand armed forces

Nigeria 
 List of equipment of the Nigerian Army

Norway 
 List of equipment of the Norwegian Army
 List of active Royal Norwegian Navy ships

Palestine 
 Palestinian domestic weapons production
 Palestinian rocket arsenal

Pakistan 
 List of active Pakistan Navy ships
 Equipment of the Pakistan Army
 List of missiles of Pakistan
 List of active Pakistan Air Force aircraft

Philippines 
 Equipment of the Philippine Army
 Equipment of the Philippine Air Force
Active military aircraft of the Philippines
 Equipment of the Philippine Navy
 Equipment of the Philippine Marine Corps

Poland  
 Equipment of the Polish Army
 List of ships of the Polish Navy
 Polish Air Force

Portugal  
 Equipment of the Portuguese Army
 Active Portuguese Navy ships
 List of aircraft of the Portuguese Air Force

Romania 
 Equipment of the Romanian Armed Forces
 List of aircraft of the Romanian Air Force

Russia 
 List of active Russian Navy ships
 List of active Russian Air Force aircraft
 List of active Russian military aircraft
 List of equipment of the Russian Ground Forces

Saudi Arabia 
 List of equipment of the Saudi Arabian Army
 List of aircraft of the Royal Saudi Air Force
 List of ships of the Royal Saudi Navy

Serbia 
 List of equipment of the Serbian Armed Forces
 List of aircraft of the Serbian Air Force
 List of equipment of the Serbian River Flotilla

Slovakia 
 List of equipment of the Slovak Army

South Africa 
 List of equipment of the South African Army
 List of aircraft of the South African Air Force
 List of weapon systems of the South African Air Force
 List of active South African Navy ships

South Korea 
 List of active Republic of Korea Navy ships
 List of equipment of the Republic of Korea Army

Spain 
 List of active Spanish Navy ships
 List of currently active Spain military land vehicles
 List of active Spanish military aircraft

Sri Lanka 
 Sri Lanka Army Equipment
 List of current Sri Lanka Navy ships
 Sri Lanka Air Force Inventory

Sweden  
 List of equipment of the Swedish Army
 List of weapons of the Swedish Air Force
 List of equipment of the Swedish Air Force
 List of active Swedish Navy ships

Switzerland  
 List of equipment of the Swiss Armed Forces

Syria 
 Equipment of the Syrian Army
 Syrian Air Force

Taiwan
 List of equipment of the Republic of China Army
 Aircraft of the Republic of China Air Force
 Active Republic of China Navy Ships

Thailand 
 List of equipment of the Royal Thai Army
 Equipment of the Royal Thai Navy
 Aircraft of the Royal Thai Air Force

Turkey 
 List of active aircraft of the Turkish Air Force 
 List of equipment of the Turkish Land Forces 
 List of active Turkish Navy ships

Ukraine 
 Active Ukrainian Navy ships
 Equipment of the Ukrainian Ground Forces
 List of equipment of the National Guard of Ukraine

United Kingdom 
 Active Royal Navy ships
 List of active Royal Marines military watercraft
 List of equipment of the Royal Marines
 Royal Fleet Auxiliary 
 Active United Kingdom military aircraft
 Modern equipment of the British Army
 Active Royal Navy weapon systems

United States 
 Equipment of the United States Armed Forces
 currently active United States military missiles
 List of currently active United States military land vehicles
 List of individual weapons of the U.S. Armed Forces
 Uniforms of the United States Armed Forces
 Equipment of the United States Army
 Equipment of the United States Marine Corps
 Equipment of the United States Navy
 currently active ships of the United States Navy
 currently active United States military watercraft
 Equipment of the United States Air Force
 currently active United States military aircraft
 Equipment of the United States Coast Guard

Vietnam
List of equipment of the Vietnam People's Ground Forces
List of equipment of the Vietnam People's Air Force
List of equipment of the Vietnam People's Navy

Venezuela
List of equipment of the Venezuelan Army
Bolivarian Military Aviation

See also
List of militaries by country

Equipment, currentlyactive